Grow Up is an open world adventure platform video game developed by Ubisoft Reflections and published by Ubisoft. The game, which is the sequel to 2015's Grow Home, was released on 16 August 2016 for Microsoft Windows, PlayStation 4, and Xbox One.

Gameplay

Grow Up builds upon the gameplay of its predecessor, Grow Home, by once again putting players in control of a robot named B.U.D, who is able to climb on landscapes. While the game still features B.U.D's ability to direct the stalks of Starplants into energy sources to help them grow, the main goal of the game now is to recover parts of B.U.D's ship, M.O.M, which are spread across the planet after she crashed into the moon. New to the game is the ability to scan various plants, known as floraforms, which each have unique properties such as allowing B.U.D to jump high or launch into the air. Once a floraform has been scanned, B.U.D can plant a seed of it at any time to grow anywhere else. By finding ability capsules, B.U.D can obtain new abilities, such as a jetpack, gliding, and rolling into a ball, which can each be upgraded by collecting crystals hidden across the world. By completing challenges, which require B.U.D to go through multiple checkpoints within a time limit, the player can unlock optional B.U.D Suits, which each give B.U.D unique properties, such as a bee suit that attracts bugs or an aviator suit that increases gliding speed.

Reception

Grow Up received "mixed or average" reviews, according to video game review aggregator Metacritic.

Notes

References

External links
 

2016 video games
3D platform games
Adventure games
Open-world video games
PlayStation 4 games
Video games about robots
Single-player video games
Ubisoft games
Video game sequels
Video games about plants
Video games developed in the United Kingdom
Video games set on fictional islands
Windows games
Xbox One games